"Taylor Gang" is a song by American rapper Wiz Khalifa, originally from his mixtape Cabin Fever, later included as the iTunes bonus track on his debut studio album Rolling Papers (2011). The song was written and produced by Lex Luger and features fellow Pittsburgh rapper Chevy Woods.

The song peaked at number 22 on the Bubbling Under Hot 100 Singles chart.

Background 
The song "Initiation" off Wiz Khalifa's second album ONIFC has been described as being a sequel to "Taylor Gang".

Music video
Two music videos were filmed for the song, both directed by Bill Palladino. The first music video shows the Taylor Gang crew members with animated smiley faces and wearing colored wigs while celebrating, smoking marijuana and drinking; however, the video was rejected due to its content and was released on Wiz Khalifa's website. The second and official music video was released through Atlantic Records and shows footage of Wiz Khalifa performing at several on-stage concerts.

Charts

Certifications

References 

2011 singles
2011 songs
Wiz Khalifa songs
Song recordings produced by Lex Luger (musician)
Songs written by Lex Luger (musician)
Songs written by Wiz Khalifa
Atlantic Records singles